Arnova is:
 a last name
 Alba Arnova (1930–2018), an Italian ballerina and film actress
 an association name
 Arnova Technology Hong Kong, China, previously Archos Technology Hong Kong
 Association for Research on Nonprofit Organizations and Voluntary Action (ARNOVA), founded as Association of Voluntary Action Scholars